Intense Tropical Cyclone Giovanna was a powerful tropical cyclone that affected Madagascar. Giovanna was the ninth tropical depression, seventh named storm and third tropical cyclone of the 2011–12 South-West Indian Ocean cyclone season. Giovanna was blamed for 35 deaths along the Madagascar coast, La Réunion, and Mauritius, and it was the first intense tropical cyclone to impact Madagascar since Cyclone Bingiza in February 2011.

Meteorological history

Cyclone Giovanna developed from a tropical wave over the Indian Ocean heading to the southwest on February 7. The tropical disturbance soon developed into Tropical Depression 09 on February 9. On the same day, the Joint Typhoon Warning Center upgraded the system, giving it the designation "12S". The storm intensified into a moderate tropical storm and was given the name Giovanna. On February 10, Giovanna continued to strengthen into a severe tropical storm. Later the same day, Giovanna went through a rapid intensification period and became an intense tropical cyclone, due to favorable environmental conditions.

Soon, Giovanna began an eyewall replacement cycle and weakened into a Category 3-equivalent tropical cyclone on February 11, due to high wind shear around the system.

At about 2200 UTC on February 13 (0100 EAT February 14), Giovanna made landfall at Andevoranto, Madagascar. Giovanna then weakened into an overland tropical depression on February 14. Early on February 15 Giovanna moved back out into open water, and drifted southwestward over the next few days. On February 18, Giovanna turned eastwards, and the storm was steered into warmer waters off the southern coast of Madagascar by a strong anticyclone located to the south. Giovanna strengthened into a Category 2 tropical cyclone again, and developed a small eye. However, the eye soon underwent another eyewall replacement cycle, and again began to weaken. On February 20, Giovanna entered an area of strong vertical wind shear, which displaced the system's convection to south of the circulation center and quickly weakened the system into a tropical depression. On February 22, the continued strong shear caused Giovanna to degenerate into a remnant low. The remnants of the storm moved further northwestward the next day, due to a Fujiwhara interaction with a stronger system to the east, Moderate Tropical Storm Hilwa, and late on February 24, Giovanna's remnants dissipated east of Madagascar.

Preparation and impact
Another fatality took place in Mauritius after a man lost control of his motorcycle during poor weather and crashed into an electricity pylon.

At least 33 people were killed by Giovanna in Madagascar. Flooding and strong winds were the main destructive forces, besides the storm surge which floods many coastal areas. Thousands of people were affected by this cyclone all across Madagascar with, flooding and strong winds which mostly caused 60% of homes to be damaged or destroyed. Two villages on small islands near Madagascar were reportedly "wiped off the map." Reports indicated that 75 to 90% of structures in those areas were destroyed by the storm.

See also

 2011–12 South-West Indian Ocean cyclone season
Cyclone Enawo
Cyclone Batsirai (2022) - had a similar path and intensity and occurred exactly ten years after

References

External links
 Weather Underground tracking of Giovanna

Giovanna
Giovanna
Giovanna
Giovanna

de:Zyklonsaison im Südwestindik 2011–2012